The British Cheerleading Association was established in 1984 to educate on the activity of cheerleading in the UK. The BCA is now considered the governing body for cheerleading in the UK, and supports over 25,000 members.

Competitions 
The BCA hosts several cheerleading competitions a year, for all different levels, including;

The Regional "Classics"
The Regional "Schools"
National Universities
National Championships
The Rocks! Series

References

External links 
 Official British Cheerleading Association website

Cheerleading organizations